Alaa Shaaban (born 21 August 1989) is an Egyptian professional footballer who plays as midfielder. He transferred to Al Ahly From Al Hamam Football Club in the 2008–09 season.

References

Living people
1989 births
Egyptian footballers
Association football midfielders
Egyptian Premier League players
Al Ahly SC players
Place of birth missing (living people)
21st-century Egyptian people